Looking for X is a children's novel written for ages 9–12 by Deborah Ellis. This book is about an eleven-year-old girl named Khyber that lives in a poorer area, Regent Park, in Toronto, Ontario. She lives there with her mother and her twin brothers who are both autistic. One day Khyber shows up at school and is accused of breaking the windows of her teacher's classroom. When she is expelled she sets off in the middle of the night to find her friend X, a homeless woman who lives in the park across the street from her house. She is the only one that can clear Khyber's name. She spends all night wandering the streets in search of X and has the adventure of a lifetime.

Awards
 Governor General's Literary Awards Winner 2000 Children's Literature (Text) Canada
 Runner-up in the Groundwood Twentieth Anniversary First Novel for Children Contest

References

1999 Canadian novels
Canadian children's novels
Novels set in Toronto
1999 children's books
Governor General's Award-winning children's books